Streptomyces cirratus is a bacterium species from the genus of Streptomyces. Streptomyces cirratus produces phegomycin, phegomycin D, phegomycin DGPT, cirratiomycin A, cirramycin A and cirramycin B.'

See also 
 List of Streptomyces species

References

Further reading

External links
Type strain of Streptomyces cirratus at BacDive -  the Bacterial Diversity Metadatabase

cirratus
Bacteria described in 1963